Charlene Soraia Santaniello Jones, known as Charlene Soraia, is an English singer-songwriter.

She first became known with a cover of The Calling's "Wherever You Will Go", which peaked at number 3 in the UK Singles Chart. She released her debut studio album, Moonchild, in November 2011, which features "Wherever You Will Go" as a bonus track. She released her second studio album, Love Is the Law, in September 2015, which features the singles "Ghost", "Broken", "Caged", and "I'll Be There".

Early life
Born and raised in Sydenham, London Borough of Lewisham in London, Charlene Soraia grew up with her parents. She first picked up her father's guitar at the age of 5, and played her first show at 8. She was inspired by artists such as David Bowie, The Beatles, Pink Floyd and King Crimson, and was very interested in the prog-rock genre.

While still at school, Soraia used to appear at open mic night at The Studio, Beckenham, Bromley in London around 2004, where her style and songwriting were still developing.  She used the time before her performances to do her homework.

She attended into the BRIT School alongside future chart artists Adele and Kate Nash. While being there, she formed a rock band called Retrospect, with whom she released an EP entitled Long Hair, Short Memories. She also joined a psychedelic blues band, Electriq Mistress. At the same time she released a solo EP, "Lemonade", which was mainly created to get her bookings. She began performing as a solo artist in 2008, releasing further EPs Daffodils and Other Idylls (March 2008); Postcards from iO later in the year and third in the series, One of the Sun. The former reached the top of the UK Folk Chart on iTunes. An iTunes Live Sessions EP was also released after she performed at the festival in early 2008.

Career
Soraia became noticed by a mainstream audience in 2011 when her cover of "Wherever You Will Go" by The Calling was featured in a Twinings commercial. The song was subsequently released as a digital download on iTunes and reached number 2 on the UK Download Chart and number 3 in the UK Singles Chart. The original version of the song, which itself peaked at number 3 in the UK in June 2002 from the album "Camino Palmero", also re-entered the top 40 as a result, this time reaching number 16. Her debut album Moonchild, featuring the song as a bonus track, was released on 21 November 2011. On 10 January 2013, Soraia released the video for her song "Ghost". On 21 July 2014, she released another video for her song "Caged". And on 11 September 2015, she released her second studio album Love Is the Law.

Personal life
Soraia has been diagnosed with bipolar disorder, specifically stating that she suffers from cyclothymia. which she describes as a less severe form of bipolar disorder. [..] I wrote [a song on the LP called] 'Bipolar' and it came out really upbeat and funny despite the fact I was actually in pieces. [...]

Discography

Studio albums

Singles

References

External links
Official website

1988 births
Living people
Singers from London
People from Lewisham
English women singer-songwriters
English folk musicians
English women guitarists
English guitarists
People with bipolar disorder
People educated at the BRIT School
Child pop musicians
Musicians from Kent
21st-century English women singers
21st-century English singers
21st-century British guitarists
Peacefrog Records artists
21st-century women guitarists